Azakh may refer to:

İdil, a town in Turkey
Azakh, Iraq, a village in the Iraqi Kurdistan region